is a 1969 Japanese action and yakuza film directed by Toshio Masuda It stars Tetsuya Watari.

Plot
Source:
Tetsu Kazama, a senior member of the Nishio clan (Yakuza clan) kills Yoshie, the head of the hostile yakuza clan. When Tetsu is released from prison, he learns that Nishio clan has dissolved and Nishio clan's old territory is now controlled by the Hirata clan.

Cast
Source:
 Tetsuya Watari as Tetsu Kazama
 Mitsuo Hamada as Toshio
 Tatsuya Fuji as Kōkichi Nodera
 Isao Sasaki as Jiro
 Yoshirō Aoki as Kaneo Yoshioka
 Kaneko Iwasaki as Yōko Nishioka
 Rie Yokoyama as Keiko
 Isao Bito as Mamoru
 Toru Abe as Nishio
 Nobuo Kaneko as Hirata

Theme song
 Kōya no Akai Hana : Tetsuya Watari

References

External links
Daikanbu Nagurikomi at Nikkatsu

1969 films
Films directed by Toshio Masuda
Nikkatsu films
1960s Japanese-language films
1960s Japanese films